Kőbánya Cycling Team was a UCI Continental team founded in 2016 and based in Hungary. It participates in UCI Continental Circuits races.

Team roster

References

UCI Continental Teams (Europe)
Cycling teams based in Hungary
Cycling teams established in 2016